Croatia joined the World Bank in 1993, two years after declaring independence from the Socialist Federal Republic of Yugoslavia in 1991. The World Bank's projects from the mid-1990s to the mid-2000s primarily focused on infrastructural and environmental projects.

Beginning with the 2008 global economic downturn and Eurozone crisis, Croatia's economy entered a recession that lasted until 2016. While still in the midst of its recession, Croatia officially became the 28th member state of the European Union (EU) on July 1, 2013. Croatia's entrance into the EU, combined with continuing financial troubles, shifted the World Bank's primary focus away from infrastructure and towards institutional financial restructuring. The World Bank financed lending projects to help Croatia converge with the EU, as well as to help the Croatian National Bank develop a financial policy that would improve Croatia's financial prospects. Following Croatia's emergence from its recession, lending from the International Bank for Reconstruction and Development (IBRD) and the International Finance Corporation (IFC) fell sharply to 22 million in 2016, compared to $279 million in the previous year. However, in 2017, the World Bank's commitments rose to a new high of $394 million.

Financing 
Croatia has relationships with three branches of the World Bank Group: the IBRD, the IFC, and the Multilateral Investment Guarantee Agency (MIGA).

IBRD 

Since the beginning of its relationship with Croatia in 1993, the World Bank has financed a total of 77 projects with Croatia through the IBRD. As of June 8, 2019, 65 projects were closed, five were dropped, one is in the pipeline, and six are active. Of the six active projects, five are loans totaling $369 million, and the sixth is a $370 million road guarantee. Historically, these projects largely focused on issues such as public expenditure, financial management and procurement, services and infrastructure for both the public and private sectors, and environmental policies and institutions. More recently, IBRD projects have begun to work more closely with funding from MIGA and IBRD to achieve the Country Partnership Strategy goals. Transitioning from infrastructure, these projects focus on the business environment in Croatia and on facilitating international development for Croatian companies.

IFC 
As of June 7, 2019, the total value of IFC loans starting from FY2001 is approximately $608.39 million; the total value of equity is approximately $35.37 million; the total value of guarantees is $0; and the total value of risk management is $0.

MIGA 
In FY2010 and FY2012, MIGA issued a total of seven project guarantees in Croatia, totaling approximately $955 million.

The World Bank's strategy in Croatia
The United Nations classifies Croatia as a developed economy. Croatia is considered a high-income country, making it one of the World Bank's richest borrowers. Primary education enrollment, although dipping to a historic low of 91% in 2010, hovers on average at 95% as of 2016. Since 1960, life expectancy at birth has steadily increased, reaching a high of 78.022 years in 2016. As such, borrowing from the World Bank Group is now primarily focused on promoting growth by aiding private infrastructure and financial sectors using economic lending instruments.

Real GDP growth in Croatia has been historically low since the 2008–2016 recession. GDP growth decreased slightly to 2.7% in 2018, down from 2.9% in 2017. While real GDP began to increase after the end of the recession, the change might not have been quick enough to offset the growth of public debt, which will further contribute to poverty in the long-term. The country's unemployment rate peaked from 2013 to 2014 at 17.3% and has gradually decreased, with projections of unemployment dropping lower than 12.5% by 2018. The stagnated decrease in national poverty may be a long-term trend resulting from the recession, implicating that this will continue to slow economic growth in the long-term. As of 2018, the poverty rate has seen a slight decrease to 4.6%, but GDP has only had moderate growth. A projected government deficit, a decrease in private investment, slow structural labor reforms, and the low absorption of EU funds have contributed to an overall concern for Croatia's lower-income population's poverty rates.

Country Partnership Strategy 2014–2017 

The primary goal of the World Bank's Croatia Country Partnership Strategy FY14-17 was to facilitate Croatia's addition to the EU by implementing structural financial reforms to aid convergence. With Croatia's entry to the EU, grants increased seven times to €290 million in 2013. The World Bank planned to help Croatia achieve effective EU membership by emphasizing strong economic fundamentals, based on a combination of three “pillars" that would be interdependent on grants from the EU while simultaneously enacting reforms to carry out policy goals of the EU. The first pillar was public finance, which emphasized the need for fiscal consolidation in government budgets and health to keep growth steady in the medium-term and long-term. The World Bank planned to improve relations with the Croatian National Bank (CNB) and Ministry of Finance and to oversee the utilization of financial instruments to complement development policy loans (DPL). The first pillar focused on the need for fiscal adjustment while continuing to make policy-based loans to support structural reform. The second pillar was competitiveness, which aimed to increase Croatia's private-sector share of the economy, which was 70% at the time and low compared to those of the other members of the EU. Goals included strengthening public infrastructure, including railways, transit, and other enterprises; improving market oversight by introducing red tape reforms to an inefficient administrative system; and encouraging a private sector-led transition to a knowledge economy for investment and post-privatization financing. The third pillar was EU membership, which targeted both reforms to align with the Europe 2020 Strategy using EU funds and reforms to accommodate the expansion of the public sector to better absorb and utilize EU funds. The strategy identified Croatia's natural geography along the coast of the Adriatic Sea as an opportunity for improved regional cooperative relationships with nearby countries and trading partners Bosnia and Herzegovina, Hungary, and Austria. The strategy anticipated that reform goals might be both lending (financial) and non-lending (institutional) in nature, primarily focusing on a closer adherence to EU standards of gender parity in employment.

Country Partnership Framework FY2019–FY2024 

On May 7, 2019, the World Bank Group disclosed its Croatia Country Partnership Framework for FY19-FY24. The overarching objective of the Country Partnership Framework is to support capacity building needed for Croatia's EU convergence and eventual World Bank donor status. The FY19-FY24 Country Partnership Framework also identifies three areas of focus: enhancing public sector performance and institutions, preserving and leveraging natural capital to ensure low carbon growth, and strengthening market institutions to enable a dynamic enterprise sector.

Notable projects

Second Rijeka Gateway Project (ongoing) 

Begun in 2008 and slated to finish by December 2018, the second Rijeka Gateway Project has been a massive infrastructure project to revitalize and modernize the port of Rijeka, the largest seaport in Croatia with a historically favorable geographic location on the Adriatic Sea. The second Rijeka Gateway project will improve infrastructure that builds a better connection between the port and highways, improve quality of service for private sector investments, and increase capacity in the port of Rijeka. Specifically, the improved quality of services will include increased Rijeka port container capacity, increased container traffic, and increased container terminal efficiency. Port service enhancement and terminal development are the target goals to increase private sector involvement, by increasing the portion of dry cargo port activities operated by a private majority ownership sector from a baseline of 29% in 2007 to an end target of 65% in 2018. The project also targets improved financial performance in the public sector by reducing subsidies for interest as a percentage of operating revenues, from a baseline of 46% in 2007 down to an end target of 10% by 2018.

References

World Bank Group relations